In Finnish folklore, Etiäinen refers to a haltija (genie, guardian spirit), that is, an image, doppelgänger or just an impression that goes ahead of a person.

Etiäinen may also refer to:
"Etiäinen" (song), a song by Finnish symphonic power metal band Nightwish, first recorded in 1996